This is a list of hills in Dorset. Many of these hills are important historical, archaeological and nature conservation sites, as well as popular hiking and tourist destinations in the county of Dorset in southern England.

Colour key

The table is colour-coded based on the classification or "listing" of the hill. The two types that occur in Dorset are Marilyns, HuMPs and TuMPs, listings based on topographical prominence. "Prominence" correlates strongly with the subjective significance of a summit. Peaks with low prominences are either subsidiary tops of a higher summit or relatively insignificant independent summits. Peaks with high prominences tend to be the highest points around and likely to have extraordinary views. A Marilyn is a hill with a prominence of at least 150 metres or about 500 feet. A "HuMP" (the acronym comes from "Hundred Metre Prominence) is a hill with a prominence of at least 100 but less than 150 metres. In this table Marilyns are in beige and HuMPs in lilac. The term "sub-Marilyn" or "sub-HuMP" is used, e.g. in the online Database of British and Irish Hills to indicate hills that fall just below the threshold. To qualify for inclusion, hills must either be 200 metres or higher with a prominence of at least 30 metres, below 200 metres with a prominence of at least 90 metres (the threshold for a sub-HuMP) or be in some other way notable. For further information see the Lists of mountains and hills in the British Isles and the individual articles on Marilyns, HuMPs and TuMPs. By way of contrast, see also the article listing Tumps (a traditional term meaning a hillock, mound, barrow or tumulus).

The county top (i.e. highest point) of Poole unitary authority is not strictly in the county of Dorset, but is included for interest because it falls within Dorset's historic county boundary.

List of hills 

Footnotes:

1. Ferranti's Summit Listings by Relative Height does not list Ridgeway Hill but suggests that the highest point of this stretch of the Purbecks is Povington Hill (198 m, drop 107 m). However, the current Ordnance Survey Landranger map (No. 194) agrees with Jackson (2009), which gives Ridgeway Hill as the highest point in the area at 199 m (drop 107 m).

2. The following summits listed by the North Dorset Ramblers have been omitted from the table as they are considered sub-peaks or alternative names of hills in the main list:
 Gore Hill (265 m), Dorset Downs, SW spur of Telegraph Hill
 Higher Melcombe Hill (262 m), Dorset Downs, possibly alternative name for Lyscombe Hill
 High Stoy (260 m) - Dorset Downs, NE spur of Telegraph Hill
 Nettlecombe Tout (258 m) - N spur of Lyscombe Hill with a hill fort.
 Weston Hill (250 m,  (est.)), NW extension of Toller Down ridge on A356
 Beaminster Down (244 m), flanks of the Toller Down ridge, NE of Beaminster 
 Ayles Hill (240 m,  (est.)), outlier of Telegraph Hill by A 37. Celtic field system. Spelt "Ayles's Hill" on OS Landranger map.
 White Way Earthwork  (218 m), N of A 35 X with 2 minor roads, nr Litton Cheney, 18 km W of Dorchester, S spur of Eggardon Hill.
 Stonebarrow Hill, SW spur of Chardown Hill.

See also 
 List of mountains and hills of the United Kingdom
 List of Marilyns in England
 Geography of Dorset

References and footnotes 

 
Dorset
Hills